Kenny Dehaes (born 10 November 1984 in Uccle) is a Belgian former professional road bicycle racer, who rode professionally between 2006 and 2019 for the , , ,  and  teams.

Major results

2005
 1st Ronde Van Vlaanderen Beloften
2006
 10th Paris–Brussels
2007
 1st Schaal Sels
 7th Paris–Brussels
 7th De Vlaamse Pijl
2008
 1st Stage 3 Four Days of Dunkirk
 1st Stage 1 Tour of Belgium
 5th Gent–Wevelgem
 5th Overall Tour de Picardie
 4th Memorial Rik Van Steenbergen
2009
 1st Grote Prijs Beeckman-De Caluwé
 4th Memorial Rik Van Steenbergen
 4th Paris–Brussels
 5th Schaal Sels-Merksem
 6th Grand Prix de Denain
2010
 1st Grote Prijs Beeckman-De Caluwé
 3rd Grand Prix de Fourmies
 4th Nokere Koerse
 6th Omloop van het Houtland
 6th Nationale Sluitingsprijs
2011
 2nd Overall Tour de Picardie
1st  Points classification
 2nd Grote Prijs Jef Scherens
 6th Druivenkoers Overijse
 6th Dutch Food Valley Classic
 10th Grand Prix de Fourmies
2012
 4th Halle–Ingooigem
 9th Handzame Classic
2013
 1st Trofeo Palma de Mallorca
 1st Handzame Classic
 1st Halle–Ingooigem
 1st Stage 4 Tour de Wallonie
 2nd Heistse Pijl
 4th Le Samyn
 5th Druivenkoers Overijse
 7th Scheldeprijs
 8th Trofeo Campos–Santanyí–Ses Salines
 10th Brabantse Pijl
2014
 1st Ronde van Drenthe
 1st Nokere Koerse
 7th GP Maurice Raes
 8th Handzame Classic
2015
 1st Grote Prijs Stad Zottegem
 9th Brussels Cycling Classic
2016
 1st Ronde van Limburg
 1st Stage 5 Four Days of Dunkirk
 3rd Grand Prix de Denain
 3rd Arnhem–Veenendaal Classic
 3rd Overall Tour de Picardie
1st Stage 3
 3rd Antwerpse Havenpijl
 4th Heistse Pijl
 4th Kampioenschap van Vlaanderen
 7th Grand Prix de la Somme
 7th Ronde van Drenthe
 8th Brussels Cycling Classic
 9th Omloop Mandel-Leie-Schelde
 10th Nokere Koerse
2017
 1st Gooikse Pijl
 2nd Tour de l'Eurométropole
 2nd Grote Prijs Jef Scherens
 2nd Heistse Pijl
 3rd Handzame Classic
 3rd GP Stad Zottegem
 4th Brussels Cycling Classic
 5th Arnhem–Veenendaal Classic
 7th Nationale Sluitingsprijs
2018
 1st Grand Prix de Denain
 1st Grand Prix de la ville de Pérenchies
 3rd Grote Prijs Jean-Pierre Monseré
 4th Trofeo Campos, Porreres, Felanitx, Ses Salines
 4th Schaal Sels
 5th Ronde van Limburg
 6th Handzame Classic
 7th Brussels Cycling Classic
 8th Kampioenschap van Vlaanderen

References

External links 

 

Palmares at Cycling Base (French)

Belgian male cyclists
1984 births
Living people
People from Uccle
Cyclists from Brussels